Woodford Reserve is a brand of premium small batch Kentucky straight bourbon whiskey produced in Woodford County, Kentucky, by the Brown-Forman Corporation. It is made from a mixture of copper pot still spirits produced at the company's Woodford Reserve Distillery, and column still spirits from the Brown Forman Distillery in Shively, Kentucky. Each 45.2% alcohol by volume (90.4 US Proof) bottle bears a unique batch and bottle number. The brand was introduced in 1996. Domestic sales of Woodford Reserve surpassed one million cases in 2021.

History
The Woodford Reserve Distillery, formerly known as the Old Oscar Pepper Distillery and later the Labrot & Graham Distillery, is approximately eight miles from the town of Versailles in north-central Kentucky, off U.S. Route 60 between Interstate 64 and Versailles.

Distilling began on the site of the current day distillery in 1812. Although the site has not been continuously operational as a distillery since, the main structure, built in 1838, stands as one of the oldest distilleries in Kentucky. It is listed on the National Register of Historic Places, and is designated as a National Historic Landmark for its well-preserved distillery architecture and its role in the development of the bourbon industry.

Originally established by Elijah Pepper, the distillery was passed on to his son and known as the Oscar Pepper Distillery when James C. Crow worked there in the mid-19th century. During this time Crow undertook a series of activities that improved and codified the understanding and quality of key bourbon-making processes such as sour mash fermentation, pot still distillation and barrel maturation. After Oscar Pepper died in 1867 the distillery was passed to his son James E. Pepper. The Pepper family sold the property to Leopold Labrot and James Graham in 1878, who owned and operated it (except during Prohibition) until it was sold to the Brown-Forman Corporation in 1941. Brown-Forman operated it until the late 1960s, then sold the property and its accompanying acreage to a local farmer. Brown-Forman re-purchased the property in 1993, refurbished it, and brought it back into operation. The Woodford Reserve brand was introduced to the market in 1996.

The distillery produces: Woodford Reserve Bourbon, Woodford Reserve Double Oaked, Woodford Reserve Straight Rye Whiskey, Woodford Reserve Straight Malt Whiskey, and Woodford Reserve Wheat Whiskey. It also distills some limited edition releases, including Woodford Reserve Master's Collection, Woodford Reserve Master's Collection Batch Proof, a Kentucky-only Distillery Series, and a special commemorative bottle it releases annually in conjunction with its official sponsorship of the Kentucky Derby.

Master Distiller 
Up until 2023, the Master Distiller of Woodford Reserve was Chris Morris (a position he has held since 2003) and the Assistant Master Distiller was Elizabeth McCall.

In 2023, Elizabeth McCall was named Master Distiller of Woodford Reserve with Chris Morris to serve as Master Distiller Emeritus. McCall had been with Brown-Forman since 2009, and was previously the Woodford Reserve Assistant Master Distiller.

Reviews and accolades
International Spirit ratings organizations and liquor review bodies have generally given Woodford Reserve solid scores.  At the San Francisco World Spirits Competition, Woodford Reserve's best performances have been in 2005 and 2013, winning a double gold medal each time. It has also won gold (2006–2007, 2011–2012) and silver (2008, 2010) medals at this annual event. The Beverage Testing Institute has given the Reserve scores of between 90 and 91 and Wine Enthusiast awarded it a 90–95 point rating.  Spirits ratings aggregator proof66.com, which averages scores from the San Francisco World Spirits Competition, Wine Enthusiast, the Beverage Testing Institute, and others, had Woodford Reserve ranked in its highest ("Tier 1") scoring category until 2016, and subsequently had it ranked as "Tier 2".

Limited edition releases

In 2022, Woodford Reserve the Honey Barrel Finish as part of their Distillery Series. 
This expression is a Woodford Reserve Bourbon finished in barrels that once stored local honey from Woodford County, Kentucky.

Marketing activities

The Woodford Reserve Distillery offers tours and is part of the American Whiskey Trail and the Kentucky Bourbon Trail.
 
In a contract arrangement with Churchill Downs, Woodford Reserve has been declared the "official bourbon of the Kentucky Derby" and is used in a $1,000 mint julep cocktail that is sold to patrons on Derby Day. Funds from the $1,000 Mint Julep Program are donated to charitable causes.
 
Although Woodford Reserve is the Derby's "official bourbon," its sister brand, Old Forester, serves mint juleps as the "official drink" and is featured in the more moderately priced juleps at the event.

Woodford Reserve's parent company Brown-Forman has entered into a five-year deal with Churchill Downs to become the title sponsor of the Kentucky Derby after Yum! Brands pulled their sponsorship. The "Greatest Two Minutes in Sports" will now be called "the Kentucky Derby presented by Woodford Reserve."

See also
 List of bourbon brands
 List of historic whisky distilleries

References

External links

 Woodford Reserve (Brown Forman)
 Woodford Reserve Facebook page
 Background and a review of Woodford Reserve at Bourbon-Central.com
 The Whisky Portal
 National Historic Landmark: Labrot and Graham's Old Oscar Pepper Distillery

Bourbon whiskey
Brown–Forman brands
Distilleries on the National Register of Historic Places in Kentucky
Historic districts on the National Register of Historic Places in Kentucky
National Register of Historic Places in Woodford County, Kentucky
Tourist attractions in Woodford County, Kentucky
1838 establishments in Kentucky
Industrial buildings completed in 1838
1996 establishments in Kentucky
Products introduced in 1996